Kimberley Dahme (born April 22, 1966) is a rock/country music singer and songwriter who is best known as a former member of the rock band Boston. She played rhythm guitar, bass, and provided vocals.

Career
Dahme became the first female member of Boston in 2002. She learned to play the bass and began performing with Boston at the 2002 Fiesta Bowl and toured for the Corporate America album.  Her song "With You" is also featured on Corporate America. She has been featured on many Boston songs since as a vocalist, taking lead vocals on "If You Were in Love", both versions of "You Gave Up on Love", and "God Rest Ye Metal Gentleman."

In 2010, Dahme participated in a tribute album titled Mister Bolin's Late Night Revival, a compilation of 17 previously unreleased tracks written by guitar legend Tommy Bolin who died in 1976.  The album includes other artists such as HiFi Superstar, Doogie White, Eric Martin, Troy Luccketta, Jeff Pilson, Randy Jackson, Rachel Barton, Rex Carroll, Derek St. Holmes, and The 77's. A percentage of the proceeds from this project will benefit the Jackson Recovery Centers.

Dahme once performed in a Boston cover band. She has produced several country solo music albums.

References

External links
 Official website
 Official Boston site
 Kimberley Dahme UnRatedMagazine.com Review, Chicago, March 13, 2011

Living people
American women country singers
American country singer-songwriters
American rock bass guitarists
American women rock singers
American country bass guitarists
Boston (band) members
Women bass guitarists
American women singer-songwriters
Place of birth missing (living people)
1966 births
20th-century American guitarists
21st-century American women singers
21st-century American singers
20th-century American women guitarists